Harry John Swindells (born 21 February 1999) is an English cricketer. He made his List A debut for Leicestershire in the 2018 Royal London One-Day Cup on 7 June 2018. He made his Twenty20 debut for Leicestershire in the 2018 t20 Blast on 3 August 2018. He made his first-class debut on 3 June 2019, for Leicestershire in the 2019 County Championship.

References

External links
 

1999 births
Living people
English cricketers
Leicestershire cricketers
Cricketers from Leicester
English cricketers of the 21st century
Place of birth missing (living people)